Cowdalli  is a village in the southern state of Karnataka, India. It is located in the Hanur taluk of Chamarajanagar district.

Demographics
 India census, Cowdalli had a population of 8433 with 4413 males and 4020 females.

See also
 Chamarajanagar
 Districts of Karnataka
Kuratti hosur is a famous village in Hanur taluk. Kuratti hosur's improvement particularly in its business is from Cowdalli village, kuratti hosur is also famous in its festivals, namely; Kuratti Maramma, Dodamma, Chikkamma, and at every 15 years - the Karuthimmarayana Swamy festival is being celebrated here.

References

External link
https://chamrajnagar.nic.in/en/

Villages in Chamarajanagar district